Laternea triscapa is a species of fungus in the family Phallaceae. The species was first described by French botanist Pierre Jean François Turpin in 1820. It is found in Central and South America, and the West Indies.

References

Gallery

Phallales
Fungi described in 1820
Fungi of Central America
Fungi of South America